John Coggswell Conner (October 14, 1842 – December 10, 1873) was a U.S. Representative from Texas.

Born in Noblesville, Indiana, Conner attended the Noblesville public schools and Wabash College, Crawfordsville, Indiana.
He was admitted to the United States Naval Academy, Annapolis, Maryland, September 20, 1861, and remained during the academic year from 1861 to 1862.
Commissioned a second lieutenant in the Sixty-third Regiment, Indiana Volunteer Infantry, on August 30, 1862, and a first lieutenant on September 3, 1862.
Honorably discharged June 20, 1864.
He was an unsuccessful candidate for the Indiana House of Representatives election in 1866.
He was commissioned a captain in the Forty-first Regiment, United States Infantry, on July 28, 1866, and served in Texas until November 29, 1869, when he resigned, having received the nomination for Congress. Upon the readmission of Texas to representation was elected as a Democrat to the Forty-first Congress.
He was re-elected to the Forty-second Congress and served from March 31, 1870, to March 3, 1873. As his health was declining, he was not a candidate for renomination in 1872.
He died in Washington, D.C., December 10, 1873 and was interred in the Old Cemetery, Noblesville, Indiana.

Sources

1842 births
1873 deaths
Wabash College alumni
Union Army officers
Democratic Party members of the United States House of Representatives from Texas
Indiana Democrats
19th-century American politicians